Hearns is a surname. Notable people with the surname include:

Elle Hearns, African American organizer, speaker, writer, and transgender rights activist
Ronald Hearns (born 1984), American professional boxer and the son of Thomas "Hitman" Hearns
Sugar Ray Leonard vs. Thomas Hearns in 1981 and 1989, eagerly anticipated confrontations in the history of boxing
Thomas Hearns (born 1958), American 8-time world champion professional boxer

See also
Hearn (disambiguation)